Hell, in many religions, is a place of suffering during the afterlife, where wicked or unrighteous souls are punished.

Hell may also refer to:
 Hell in Christianity
 Christian views on Hades
 Hel (location), Germanic underworld from which the word "hell" derives
 Gehenna or Gehinnom
 Jahannam, Gehenna in Islam 
 Tartarus
 Underworld, the world of the dead in various religious traditions, located below the world of the living
 Any place or situation of great suffering

Arts and entertainment

Film and television 
  Jigoku (1960 film) (地獄, Hell), also titled The Sinners of Hell a Japanese horror film directed by Nobuo Nakagawa
 Hell (1964 film) or Henri-Georges Clouzot's Inferno (L'enfer), an unfinished French film by Henri-Georges Clouzot
 Hell (1994 film) (L'enfer), a French film directed by Claude Chabrol, adapted from Clouzot's 1964 film
 Hell (2005 film) (L'enfer), a French film directed by Danis Tanović
 Hell (2010 film) (El Infierno), a Mexican crime comedy
 Hell (2011 film), a German science fiction film directed by Tim Fehlbaum
 Hell, the directly translated title of Hellbound (TV Series), a South Korean dark fantasy show from 2021
 "Hell" (Father Ted), an episode of Father Ted
"Hell", an episode of Squid Game
 Dr. Hell, a character in the anime series  Mazinger Z

Literature 
 Hell (DC Comics), a fictional location in the DC Comics universe
 Hell (Barbusse novel) (L'Enfer), a 1908 novel by Henri Barbusse
 Hell (Davis novel), 1998 novel by Kathryn Davis
 Hell (play) or Hell: A Verse Drama and Photoplay , a 1924 play by Upton Sinclair
 Hell, also known as Inferno, the first volume of the Divine Comedy
 Hell, a locale in the Tomorrow series novels by John Marsden

Music

Artists
 Hell (British band), an English heavy metal band
 Hell (American band), a doom metal band from Salem, Oregon
 Hell I, 2009
 Hell II, 2010
 Hell III, 2012
 Hell, 2015 EP
 Hell (Hell album), 2017
 DJ Hell, a German house/techno DJ

Albums
 Hell (James Brown album), 1974
 Hell (Venom album), 2008
 Hell (Die Ärzte album), 2020
 Hell: The Sequel, an EP by Bad Meets Evil

Songs
 "Hell", a song by Blind Melon from Nico
 "Hell" (Disturbed song), a song by Disturbed, a B-side from the single "Stricken"
 "Hell", a song by Foo Fighters from In Your Honor
 "Hell", a song by King Gizzard & the Lizard Wizard from Infest the Rats' Nest
 "Hell", a song by Pet Shop Boys.
 "Hell", a song by Squirrel Nut Zippers from Hot
 "Hell", a song by Tegan and Sara from Sainthood
 "The Hell Song", a song by Sum 41

Other uses in arts and entertainment
 Hell (Bosch), a painting by Hieronymous Bosch
 Hell: A Cyberpunk Thriller, a 1990s video game
 Hell and Fucking Hell (Chapman), art installations by Jake and Dinos Chapman

Places 
 Hell, California, a ghost town in the U.S.
 Hell, Michigan, a community in the U.S.
 Hell, Grand Cayman, the Cayman Islands
 Hell, Norway, a village in Stjørdal
 Hell Cave, a cave in Slovenia
 Hell Creek, near Jordan, Montana, U.S.

Other uses 
 Hell (crater), a lunar crater named after Maximilian Hell
 Hell (forum), a hacking forum
 Hell (surname)
 Hell.com, a website for web designers and artists
 Hell Pizza, a New Zealand-based pizza chain
 Helles, sometimes called Hell, a light style of beer
 The transmission mode of the Hellschreiber teleprinter
 Hell Energy Drink, a Hungarian energy drink
 Helvetinjärvi ("Hell's Lake"), a national park in Ruovesi, Pirkanmaa, Finland

See also 
 
 
 Halle (disambiguation)
 Heaven and Hell (disambiguation)
 Hel (disambiguation)
 Hell on Earth (disambiguation)
 Hellas (disambiguation)
 Helle (disambiguation)
 Jigoku (disambiguation) ( in Japanese)